is a station in Sumiyoshi-ku, Osaka, Japan on the Hankai Tramway Hankai Line. The station is about 10m east from Kohama Station on the Nankai Main Line.

History
1911-12-01: Higashi-Kohama Station opens with the opening of the Hankai Tramway track
1915-06-21: Hankai Tramway merges with Nankai Railway, and Higashi-Kohama Station becomes a station of the merged company
1944-06-01: After another company merger, Higashi-Kohama Station becomes a station of Kinki Nihon Railway
1947-06-01: The line (along with the station) is transferred to Nankai Denki Railway
1980-12-01: The line (along with the station) is transferred to Hankai Tramway

Station and platforms
In order to handle two trains simultaneously, Higashi-Kohama Station is a single island platform with a track on each side.

Environs
The Sumiyoshi Higashi-Kohama Post Office is located about 100m southwest of Higashi-Kohama Station. Osaka Municipal Higashi-Kohama Elementary School is about 200m northeast of the station, with Sumiyoshi Junior High School and Sumiyoshi Elementary School just beyond that. Japan National Route 26 is accessible about 300m west of the station, and Osaka Prefectural Route 5 (Osaka-Kōyao Route) is about 550m north.

Connecting service
In addition to the Hankai Line, Higashi-Kohama Station is served by the Osaka Shiei Red Bus.

Railway stations in Japan opened in 1911
Hankai Line
Railway stations in Osaka Prefecture